Shelley Scown is an Australian singer, musician and educator who has contributed widely to the Australian and Indigenous music industry.

Biography
Scown is probably best known for her 1997 Jazz album, Angel with Paul Grabowsky Trio. She collaborated with other respected Australian musicians, such as Paul Grabowsky, Bernie McGann, The Groovematics and Kate Ceberano. The album was nominated for an ARIA music award in 1998, but lost to The Future of Today by Chaplin, Tinkler, Rex, & Lamble.

As well as working on stage, Scown has also worked in film. Her credits include: Turn It Up (1991) (an unscreened television series pilot co-starring Marg Downey, Lisa McCune and Glenn Robbins; she appeared as a character called Carsonette), Lucky Break (1994) (with Gia Carides and Anthony LaPaglia; she played a lounge singer at a resort) and as a member of the music department where she was a lead vocalist in Noah's Ark (1999).

Discography

Albums

Awards and nominations

ARIA Awards
The ARIA Music Awards are annual awards, which recognises excellence, innovation, and achievement across all genres of Australian music. They commenced in 1987. 

|-
| 1998 || Angel  || Best Jazz Album ||  
|-

Mo Awards
The Australian Entertainment Mo Awards (commonly known informally as the Mo Awards), were annual Australian entertainment industry awards. They recognise achievements in live entertainment in Australia from 1975 to 2016. Shelley Scown won one award in that time. and the Comedy Star of The Year award.
 (wins only)
|-
| 1997
| Shelley Scown
| Jazz Vocal Performer  of the Year
| 
|-

References

Australian women singers
Living people
Australian jazz singers
Year of birth missing (living people)